National Secondary Route 141, or just Route 141 (or ) is a National Road Route of Costa Rica, located in the Alajuela province.

Description
In Alajuela province the route covers Naranjo canton (Naranjo, San Miguel, San José, Cirrí Sur, San Juan districts), San Carlos canton (Quesada, Florencia, Buenavista, La Fortuna, La Tigra districts), Zarcero canton (Zarcero, Laguna, Tapezco, Zapote, Brisas districts).

History
Landslides in this route are common in the rainy season.

References

Highways in Costa Rica